The 27th association football tournament at the 2013 Southeast Asian Games took place in Myanmar between 7–21 December. It was played among U-23 (under 23 years old) national teams, while the women's tournament had no age limit.

Venues

Squads

Men's tournament
All matches were played in Thuwunna Stadium, Yangon and Zayarthiri Stadium, Naypyidaw. The official draw for the Southeast Asian Games men's football took place on 10 November 2013 in Naypyidaw, Myanmar.

Group stage
All times are Myanmar Time – UTC+6:30.

Group A
On 6 November, Philippines which was originally drawn in Group A, withdrew from the SEA Games men's football competition.

Group B

Note: Indonesia went through because they won head-to-head against Myanmar, despite Myanmar being equal in points and having a lead in goal for and goal difference.

Knockout stage

Semi-finals

Bronze medal match

Gold medal match

Final ranking

Winners

Goalscorers
3 goals

  Ahmad Hazwan Bakri
  Kyaw Ko Ko
  Hariss Harun
  Sahil Suhaimi
  Pravinwat Boonyong
  Mạc Hồng Quân

2 goals

  Soukaphone Vongchiengkham
  Ashri Chuchu
  Rozaimi Abdul Rahman
  A. Thamil Arasu
  Pokkhao Anan
  Thitipan Puangchan
  Lê Văn Thắng
  Nguyễn Văn Quyết
  Vũ Minh Tuấn

1 goal

  Mazazizi Mazlan
  Azwan Ali Rahman
  Prak Mony Udom
  Sos Suhana
  Alfin Tuasalamony
  Andri Ibo
  Bayu Gatra
  Yandi Sofyan
  Ketsada Souksavanh
  Khouanta Sivongthong
  Vilayuth Sayyabounsou
  D. Saarvindran
  Kyaw Zayar Win
  Kyi Lin
  Nay Lin Tun
  Zaw Min Tun
  Afiq Yunos
  Adisak Kraisorn
  Artit Daosawang
  Sarawut Masuk
  Diogo Rangel
  Fellipe Bertoldo
  Jairo Neto
  José Carlos da Fonseca
  Pedro Henrique
  Hà Minh Tuấn
  Phạm Mạnh Hùng
  Trần Mạnh Dũng
  Trần Phi Sơn

1 own goal
  Ketsada Souksavanh (playing against Malaysia)

Women's tournament
All match will be played in Mandalarthiri Stadium, Mandalay. Official drawing for the Southeast Asian Games women's football took place on 6 November 2013 in Naypyitaw, Myanmar.

Group stage
All times are Myanmar Time – UTC+6:30.

Group A
On 8 December, Indonesia which was originally drawn in Group A, withdrew from the SEA Games women's football competition.

Group B
On 22 November, Timor-Leste which was originally drawn in Group B, withdrew from the SEA Games women's football competition.

Knockout stage

Semi-finals

Bronze medal match

Gold medal match

Winners

Goalscorers
6 goals
  Anootsara Maijarern

5 goals
  Nguyễn Thị Minh Nguyệt

4 goals
  Yee Yee Oo

3 goals
  Kwanruethai Kunupatham

2 goals

  Angela Kais
  Sihaya Ajad
  Than Than Htwe
  Ainon Phancha
  Huỳnh Như
  Nguyễn Thị Muôn
  Nguyễn Thị Tuyết Dung

1 goal

  Noum Angmansongsa
  Khin Marlar Tun
  Khin Moe Wai
  Myint Myint Aye
  San San Maw
  Darut Changplook
  Kanjana Sungngoen
  Naphat Seesraum
  Taneekarn Dangda
  Lê Thu Thanh Hương
  Trần Thị Kim Hồng

Final standing

Medal winners

References

 
2013 Southeast Asian Games events
Football at the Southeast Asian Games

2013 in Asian football
2013
South
South